Lhermitte may refer to:

 Jean Lhermitte (1877–1959), French neurologist and neuropsychiatrist 
 Lhermitte's sign, also called Barber Chair Phenomenon, an electrical sensation produced by bending the neck forward or backward
 Lhermitte–Duclos disease, tumor of the cerebellum
 Léon Augustin Lhermitte (1844-1925), French realist painter and etcher; father of Jean Lhermitte
 Pierre Lhermite, French Navy officer and admiral
 Roger Lhermitte (1920-2016), a French meteorologist who pioneered the development of meteorological Doppler radar.
 Thierry Lhermitte (b. 1952), French actor

See also
 Hermitte (disambiguation)
 L'Hermite (disambiguation)